Uzma Naseer Gondal (born 1 January 1978) is a Pakistani former cricketer who played as a wicket-keeper and right-handed batter. She appeared in one Test match  and 17 One Day Internationals for Pakistan between 2000 and 2002. She played domestic cricket for Sialkot.

References

External links
 
 

1978 births
Living people
Place of birth missing (living people)
Pakistan women Test cricketers
Pakistan women One Day International cricketers
Sialkot women cricketers